Newpark Comprehensive School is a mixed, Church of Ireland, state comprehensive secondary school in Blackrock, County Dublin, Ireland. It was established in 1972.

History 

Newpark has a Christian tradition, reflecting its origins within the Protestant tradition, and is under the patronage of the Church of Ireland Archbishop of Dublin. The school was established in 1972, when the Department of Education purchased Avoca & Kingstown School, an amalgamation of two small private schools. Avoca School in Blackrock was founded in 1892 by A.A.[Albert Augustus] MacDonagh M.A. (1869-1934) who served for a long time as its headmaster, and Kingstown Grammar School in 1894 by Matthew Edward Devlin (whose son Rev. John Edward Devlin took over as Kingstown's headmaster in 1932).

The two founding schools catered primarily for Protestant children in the Blackrock/Dún Laoghaire area, but the schools also welcomed pupils from other religious faiths, and from none. In 1968 the original schools amalgamated as Avoca & Kingstown School at Newtownpark Avenue. Four years later it became Newpark, one of the four Comprehensive Schools established by the Government to:
make free second-level education accessible to the Protestant community within an appropriate ethos.
provide educational and recreational facilities for the local community.
act as centres for educational innovation.

Newpark has a specific obligation to the Protestant community of south Dublin/north Wicklow, and this is reflected in its special recognition of the National Schools under Protestant management in the catchment area and by the priority given to those enrolling from the Protestant community. Newpark also considers itself a pluralist community; it embraces inclusion in terms of social, cultural, religious and ethnic diversity.

Sports 
The school offers a range of sports including field hockey, rugby and basketball. Its rugby senior team has held the McMullen Cup since 2007. Avoca Hockey Club is based on the campus.The students also have access to Newpark Sports Centre which has a sports hall and a swimming pool.

Campus 
The Newpark campus covers 100,543m² (25 acres). The school was centred on a purpose-built prefab-style block, opened in 1974, but also used two large houses, "Melfield" and "Belfort" (Referred to as the Red-Brick by students), a purpose-built extension to Belfort (The D/F Building), a gate lodge and other ancillary rooms. .  In 2015 a new school building was opened to students and many of the ancillary rooms were demolished leaving only Belfort and Melfield standing from the original plan.

Facilities

Newpark Academy of Music 
Founded in 1978 to provide much needed music school facilities in south Dublin, Newpark Academy of Music, formerly Newpark Music Centre, now caters for over 1000 students and is one of the largest public music schools in Dublin. While the emphasis is on learning music for enjoyment, students and choirs from the Academy have been successful in competitions throughout the country. All exam syllabi are covered up to and including diploma level and several specialised courses not available in other music schools are offered.

As a founder member of the International Association of Schools of Jazz (IASJ), Newpark Academy of Music established its Jazz and Contemporary Music Department in 1986 and is now recognised as the primary centre for jazz and jazz related music education in the country. The staff is drawn from the greatest performers and teachers from Ireland and abroad, ensuring that students are kept up to date with the latest musical techniques, concepts and trends.

Newpark Sports Centre 
Newpark Sports Centre was built in 1973 with the sole purpose of providing a modern Physical Education facility for the school. Since then, the centre has developed into a multi-purpose facility providing a range of activities for the local community. Its sports facilities include:

 Water-based artificial grass hockey pitch
 Basketball courts
 25m swimming pool
 Health suite
 Fitness centre
 Multi-use sports hall
 500m running track
 Rugby pitches (off school grounds)

Newpark Adult Education Centre 
Newpark Adult Education Centre offers evening and night classes in a wide range of subjects for leisure and personal development.

Notable alumni and teachers 
 Chris Andrews, politician 
 Jonathan Philbin Bowman, broadcaster 
 Niall Connolly, Sinn Féin activist; one of the "Colombia Three" 
 John de Courcy Ireland, historian and political activist
John A. Furlong, CEO of the 2010 Vancouver Olympic Organizing Committee
George Gibney, disgraced national and Olympic coach (1984-1991)
 Niamh Hyland, High Court Judge
 Bryan Dobson, RTÉ News
 Fergus Johnston, composer and member of Aosdána
 Rachel Joynt, visual artist / sculptor
 Riyadh Khalaf, broadcaster, writer, and YouTuber 
 David McCullagh, RTÉ journalist and author 
 Paul Readman, Professor in Modern British History at King's College London
 Peter Pearson (painter, born 1955)
 Mario Rosenstock, actor and comedian 
 Dan Sheridan, actor

References

External links 
 

Secondary schools in Dún Laoghaire–Rathdown
Blackrock, Dublin
Anglican schools in the Republic of Ireland
Educational institutions established in 1972
1972 establishments in Ireland